Mein rasend Herz ("My Racing Heart") is the fifth studio album by the German band In Extremo. It was released on 30 May 2005 through Universal Records and entered the German Media Control Charts at number 3, its eventual peak position. It was preceded by the singles "Nur ihr allein" (17 May), "Horizont" (12 September) and "Liam" (3 February) – all featured on this album. The limited-edition disc also features the German version of "Liam".

Critical reception 

In 2005, Mein rasend Herz was ranked number 327 in Rock Hard magazine's book The 500 Greatest Rock & Metal Albums of All Time.

Track listing

Charts

References 

2005 albums
In Extremo albums
Universal Records albums
Vertigo Records albums